Velveteen is the second studio album by English rock band Transvision Vamp, released on 20 September 1989 by MCA Records. The album includes the single "Baby I Don't Care", which reached number 3 in the United Kingdom and Australia. Velveteen reached number 1 on the UK Albums Chart and number 2 in Australia, where it became the 39th best-selling album of the year.

An accompanying video album, titled The Velveteen Singles, features the videos for all four singles released from the album, as well as behind-the-scenes footage.

Critical reception
Jeff Clark-Meads, reviewer of British music newspaper Music Week, said that the band is more successful with loud and fast songs. He noted with satisfaction that "there are enough tracks here with pace and raunch to carry the casual listener through the slower, limits-of-ability-defining tracks," and summarized: "Indeed, as a package the album has life, verve and muscle and will appeal to anybody who finds the band's singles attractive."

Track listing
All tracks written by Nick Christian Sayer, except where noted.
 "Baby I Don't Care" – 4:37
 "The Only One" – 4:19
 "Landslide of Love" – 3:48
 "Falling for a Goldmine" (Sayer, Marcus Myers) – 4:28
 "Down on You" – 4:20
 "Song to the Stars" – 1:50
 "Kiss Their Sons" – 4:16
 "Born to Be Sold" – 3:44
 "Pay the Ghosts" – 4:37
 "Bad Valentine" – 3:45
 "Velveteen" – 9:51

Personnel
Transvision Vamp
 Wendy James – vocals
 Nick Christian Sayer – guitar
 Dave Parsons – bass
 Tex Axile – keyboards
 Kevin Armstrong – guitar
with:
Richard Niles - string arrangements on "Landslide of Love" and "Velveteen"
Technical
Ben Kape, Philip Bagenal - engineer
Peter Ashworth - photography

Charts

Weekly charts

Year-end charts

References

1989 albums
MCA Records albums
Transvision Vamp albums